Karen Ziemba (born November 12, 1957) is an American actress, singer and dancer, best known for her work in musical theatre. In 2000, she won the Tony Award for Best Featured Actress in a Musical for her performance in Contact.

Biography
Ziemba was born in St. Joseph, Michigan, the daughter of Barbara Marie (Heidt) and Oscar Hugo Ziemba, an investment broker. Her grandmother, Winifred Heidt, was an opera singer. Ziemba attended the University of Akron (Ohio), where she studied dance. In 1977 she danced with the Ohio Ballet.

Her Broadway debut was in A Chorus Line as Diana Morales. Later, she played the lead of Peggy Sawyer in 42nd Street. While appearing in 42nd Street, she was featured in the October 1984 issue of Playboy in the article "Babes of Broadway", in which she posed partially nude. Ziemba's other Broadway roles include Polly Baker in Crazy for You in 1992 (replacement), Roxie Hart in Chicago (1998), and Belle Hagner in Teddy & Alice (1987).

Ziemba appeared Off-Broadway in the Kander and Ebb revue And The World Goes 'Round (1991) and won the Drama Desk Award. She received a Drama Desk Award nomination (Best Actress in a Musical) for I Do! I Do! (1996). The next year, she was nominated for the 1997 Drama Desk Award (Outstanding Actress in a Musical) and a 1997 Tony Award (Actress in a Musical) for her role in Steel Pier (1997).

In 2000, Ziemba won the Tony Award for Best Featured Actress in a Musical for her performance in Susan Stroman's Contact. She played the role of "the timid, abused mafioso's wife." The CurtainUp reviewer wrote of the savvy casting "...especially Karen Ziemba, who is finally in a show that makes full use of her dual talents as an actress and dancer...Ziemba (in Did You Move?), brings an amazing female Walter Mitty vulnerability to a frustrated wife having dinner with a husband..."

She appeared in Much Ado About Nothing as Beatrice at the Hartford Stage (Connecticut) and then the Shakespeare Theatre Company (Washington, DC) in November 2002 through January 5, 2003. In 2004 she received another Tony Award nomination (Best Featured Actress in a Musical) for Never Gonna Dance. In 2007, she portrayed the heartwarming lyricist Georgia Hendricks in Curtains, earning her fourth Tony Award nomination.

She performed with the New York City Opera in 110 in the Shade as Lizzie in 1992. The AP News reviewer wrote: "Ziemba's voice is clear and sweet, exactly what's needed for a song like Is It Really Me?." She performed the role of Cleo in the City Opera's production of The Most Happy Fella in 1991. The New York Times reviewer wrote: "...her voice had swagger, grainy brashness and brassy energy, undistracted by higher ambitions."

She has appeared in several New York City Center Encores! staged musicals, including The Pajama Game in 2002 (Babe Williams), Bye Bye Birdie in 2004 and On Your Toes in 2013 (Lil Dolan).

She starred in the staged reading of Vincent Crapelli's Otherwise, with Beth Leavel and Laura Bonarrigo-Koffman.

Ziemba appeared as Dolly Gallagher Levi in Hello, Dolly! at the Drury Lane Theatre, Oak Brook, Illinois, in 2013.

She returned to Broadway in March 2014, in the new musical adaptation of Woody Allen's Bullets Over Broadway as the character "Eden Brent", directed by Susan Stroman.

In 2015 and 2017 Karen returned to Off-Broadway to play the role of "Mom/Eileen" in Kid Victory.

On television, she has appeared on Law & Order and on film in The Producers and the ill-fated, never released remake of The Devil and Daniel Webster.

In 2020, Ziemba appeared as Barbara Joblove in the musical podcast, Propaganda!

Personal life
She and actor Bill Tatum wed in 1984.

References

External links
 Karen Ziemba official site
 
 

University of Akron alumni
American female dancers
Dancers from Michigan
American film actresses
American musical theatre actresses
American television actresses
Actresses from Michigan
Drama Desk Award winners
Tony Award winners
People from St. Joseph, Michigan
1957 births
Living people
20th-century American actresses
21st-century American actresses